The Valsøy Bridge is the longest of three spans that crosses parts of the Valsøyfjorden in the municipality of Heim in Trøndelag county, Norway. The bridge, which opened in June 1993, connects the mainland of Heim to the west side of the island of Valsøya.

See also
List of bridges in Norway
List of bridges in Norway by length

References

Bridges in Trøndelag
Bridges completed in 1993
Heim, Norway